Oliver Marach and Santiago Ventura were the defending champions, but decided not to participate. Marach competed in the Serbia Open instead.
Simone Bolelli of Italy and Horacio Zeballos of Argentina defeated in the final the German couple Andreas Beck and Christopher Kas 7–6(3), 6–4 to win the title.

Seeds

Draw

Draw

References
 Main Draw

BMW Open - Doubles
2011 BMW Open